Tell Derzenoun is an archaeological site 3km south southeast of Bar Elias in the Beqaa Mohafazat (Governorate). It dates at least to the Neolithic.

References

Baalbek District
Neolithic settlements
Archaeological sites in Lebanon
Great Rift Valley